The 1940 Niagara Purple Eagles football team was an American football team that represented Niagara University in the Western New York Little Three Conference (Little Three) during the 1940 college football season. Niagara compiled a 6–1–1 record (2–0 in the Little Three), won the Little Three championship, and outscored opponents by a total of 102 to 31. Joe Bach was the head coach for the fourth year.

Schedule

References

Niagara
Niagara Purple Eagles football seasons
Niagara Purple Eagles football